The Fynbos buttonquail (Turnix hottentottus) is a bird in the family Turnicidae formerly considered conspecific with the black-rumped buttonquail (Turnix nanus). There are no subspecies.

Name
Several authorities still refer to this species as the Hottentot Buttonquail, however, as the word "Hottentot" is an offensive term for the Khoisan people, there has been a movement to change the vernacular name. The new name highlights the specific habitat requirements of this species in the Fynbos of the Cape Floristic Region.

Distribution and habitat
The species is endemic to South Africa and is found along the south coast from Cape Town to Algoa Bay in Eastern Cape province where it occurs in mountain fynbos where vegetation is relatively sparse. The lack of records suggest that this may be an overestimate, and extrapolation of a much lower density estimate from a 1990 study would result in a total population across the Western Cape of just 400 birds (Lee 2013). The total population is therefore uncertain, but given the lack of recent records is assumed to be very small. It is precautionarily estimated to lie within the band of 250-999 mature individuals, with no more than 250 individuals in the largest subpopulation.

References

Turnix
Endemic birds of South Africa
Birds described in 1815
Taxa named by Coenraad Jacob Temminck